Filip Ivanow (born 21 July 1990) is a Belarusian professional football player who plays for Krumkachy Minsk.

Honours
Shakhtyor Soligorsk
Belarusian Cup winner: 2013–14

External links
 
 

1990 births
Living people
Belarusian footballers
Association football midfielders
Belarusian expatriate footballers
Expatriate footballers in Latvia
FC Dinamo Minsk players
FC Gomel players
FC SKVICH Minsk players
FC Vitebsk players
FC Dynamo Brest players
FC Shakhtyor Soligorsk players
FC Isloch Minsk Raion players
FC Krumkachy Minsk players
FC Minsk players
FK Liepāja players